The HTC Evo 3D is a 3D-enabled Android smartphone developed by HTC, released exclusively in the United States through Sprint, and was re-released as a pre-paid smartphone by Virgin Mobile in May 2012 as the HTC Evo V 4G. A variation of Sprint's flagship HTC Evo 4G, the device is distinguished by its pair of 5 MP rear cameras, which can be used to take photos or video in stereographic 3D, which can be viewed on its  autostereoscopic display without the need for 3D glasses. Several GSM variants are also available in Canada, Europe and Asia.

History
Sprint announced the HTC EVO 3D during its CTIA in Orlando, Florida, in March 2011.

In June 2011, Sprint officially announced that the HTC Evo 3D would be available on June 24, 2011.

On May 31, 2012, shortly after the release of its successor, the HTC Evo 4G LTE, Sprint's prepaid service Virgin Mobile re-released the Evo 3D as the Evo V 4G, as its first phone to use Sprint's WiMAX network. The Evo V 4G is identical to the Evo 3D, except that it ships with Android 4.0.3 and the Sense 3.6 interface instead of Sense 3.0 and Android 2.3. The new software also became available for the Evo 3D on Sprint as an update.

Features

Processor
The Evo 3D utilizes a Snapdragon S3 chipset with a dual core 1.2 GHz processor

Screen
The Evo 3D uses a 960×540-pixel 4.3-inch screen coated with Gorilla Glass, capable of autostereoscopy for the viewing of 3D content without the need for specialized glasses.

Cameras
The Evo 3D uses two rear-facing 5-megapixel cameras, capable of capturing videos in 720p resolution in 3D or in 1080p while recording standard 2D. It can also take photos in stereographic 3D at 5 MPx2 resolution. It features a single 1.3-megapixel front-facing camera.

Software
The Evo 3D shipped with Android 2.3 and the HTC Sense 3.0 interface. An update was released to upgrade the phone to Android 4.0.3 with Sense 3.6; this update is pre-loaded on the Evo V 4G.

Storage
The Evo 3D features 4GB internal storage and a pre-installed 8 GB microSDHC card. Its microSD slot supports cards up to 32 GB.  Unofficially, the Evo 3D also supports 64 GB microSDXC cards as long as they are reformatted as FAT32 file system format.

See also
 Android version history
 List of Android devices
 List of 3D-enabled mobile phones

References

External links
 Official Sprint HTC Evo 3D website
 Official Virgin Mobile HTC Evo V 4G website

Evo 3D
Mobile phones introduced in 2011
Discontinued smartphones
Mobile phones with stereo camera
Android (operating system) devices
Mobile phones with multiple rear cameras
Mobile phones with user-replaceable battery